Pachygonidia is a genus of moths in the family Sphingidae described by David Stephen Fletcher in 1982.

Species
Pachygonidia caliginosa (Boisduval, 1870)
Pachygonidia drucei (Rothschild & Jordan, 1903)
Pachygonidia hopfferi (Staudinger, 1875)
Pachygonidia martini (Gehlen, 1943)
Pachygonidia mielkei Cadiou, 1997
Pachygonidia odile Eitschberger & Haxaire, 2002
Pachygonidia ribbei (H. Druce, 1881)
Pachygonidia subhamata (Walker, 1856)

References

 
Dilophonotini
Moth genera